Agapanthia pesarinii is a species of beetle in the family Cerambycidae. It was described by Rapuzzi and Sama in 2010.

References

pesarinii
Beetles described in 2010